Aral is a village in the Issyk-Kul Region of Kyrgyzstan. It is part of the Tüp District. Its population was 1,979 in 2021.

References

Populated places in Issyk-Kul Region